The Raising of Lazarus is a Christian miracle narrative, concerning Lazarus of Bethany.

The Raising of Lazarus may also refer to:

 The Raising of Lazarus (Caravaggio), a painting by Michelangelo Merisi da Caravaggio
 The Raising of Lazarus (Jan Lievens) 1631 painting by Dutch artist Jan Lievens
 The Raising of Lazarus (Sebastiano del Piombo), a painting by Sebastiano del Piombo
 The Raising of Lazarus (Rembrandt), a painting by Rembrandt van Rijn

See also 
 Lazarus Rising (disambiguation)